Spring Fork is an unincorporated community in Pettis County, Missouri, United States.

History
A post office called Springfork was established in 1906, and remained in operation until 1925. The community takes its name from Spring Fork creek.

References

Unincorporated communities in Pettis County, Missouri
Unincorporated communities in Missouri